Sparganothina amoebaea is a species of moth of the family Tortricidae. It is found in Guerrero, Mexico.

The length of the forewings is about 6.8 mm. The forewings are silvery white with blackish-brown markings and dispersed dark-brown, orange- or cream-coloured scales. The hindwings are pale greyish brown with thin darker brown lines toward the apex.

References

Moths described in 1913
Sparganothini